The secretary of state of South Dakota is an elected constitutional officer of the U.S. state of South Dakota. The current secretary of state is Monae Johnson.

Divisions 
The secretary of state's office is composed of three divisions:

The Business Services Division registers corporations and other business entities, as well as trademarks, DBA statements and liens filed pursuant to the Uniform Commercial Code.
The Elections Division administers elections and voter registration, and regulates campaign finance. The Secretary of State also serves as the chairperson of the South Dakota Board of Elections.
The Administrative Services Division licenses notaries public, sports agents, and lobbyists, issues apostilles and concealed pistol permits, authorizes certain types of raffles, serves as registered agent for service of process for certain out-of-state citizens and corporations, and publishes the South Dakota Legislative Manual (referred to as the Blue Book).

Other duties
The secretary serves on the State Board of Finance and maintains legislative records.

Former officeholders
See table below.

See also
List of company registers

References

External links